The meridian 54° west of Greenwich is a line of longitude that extends from the North Pole across the Arctic Ocean, Greenland, Newfoundland, the Atlantic Ocean, South America, the Southern Ocean, and Antarctica to the South Pole.

The 54th meridian west forms a great circle with the 126th meridian east.

From Pole to Pole
Starting at the North Pole and heading south to the South Pole, the 54th meridian west passes through:

{| class="wikitable plainrowheaders"
! scope="col" width="120" | Co-ordinates
! scope="col" | Country, territory or sea
! scope="col" | Notes
|-
| style="background:#b0e0e6;" | 
! scope="row" style="background:#b0e0e6;" | Arctic Ocean
| style="background:#b0e0e6;" |
|-
| style="background:#b0e0e6;" | 
! scope="row" style="background:#b0e0e6;" | Lincoln Sea
| style="background:#b0e0e6;" |
|-
| 
! scope="row" | 
|Nyeboe Land
|-valign="top"
| style="background:#b0e0e6;" | 
! scope="row" style="background:#b0e0e6;" | Baffin Bay
| style="background:#b0e0e6;" | Passing just west of Illorsuit Island,  (at )
|-
| 
! scope="row" | 
| Nuussuaq Peninsula
|-
| style="background:#b0e0e6;" | 
! scope="row" style="background:#b0e0e6;" | Sullorsuaq Strait
| style="background:#b0e0e6;" |
|-
| 
! scope="row" | 
| Disko Island
|-valign="top"
| style="background:#b0e0e6;" | 
! scope="row" style="background:#b0e0e6;" | Davis Strait
|-valign="top"
| style="background:#b0e0e6;" | 
! scope="row" style="background:#b0e0e6;" | Atlantic Ocean
| style="background:#b0e0e6;" | Labrador Sea An unnamed part of the Ocean — passing just east of Fogo Island, Newfoundland and Labrador,  (at )
|-
| 
! scope="row" | 
| Newfoundland and Labrador — island of Newfoundland
|-
| style="background:#b0e0e6;" | 
! scope="row" style="background:#b0e0e6;" | Placentia Bay
| style="background:#b0e0e6;" |
|-
| 
! scope="row" | 
| Newfoundland and Labrador — Avalon Peninsula on the island of Newfoundland
|-
| style="background:#b0e0e6;" | 
! scope="row" style="background:#b0e0e6;" | Atlantic Ocean
| style="background:#b0e0e6;" |
|-
| 
! scope="row" | 
| For about 10 km at the extreme north-east of the country
|-
| 
! scope="row" | 
| French Guiana
|-
| 
! scope="row" | 
| For about 13 km
|-valign="top"
| 
! scope="row" | 
| French Guiana — passing through some territory claimed by 
|-valign="top"
| 
! scope="row" | 
| Amapá Pará — from  Mato Grosso — from  Mato Grosso do Sul — from  Paraná — from 
|-
| 
! scope="row" | 
|
|-
| 
! scope="row" | 
| Rio Grande do Sul
|-
| 
! scope="row" | 
|
|-
| style="background:#b0e0e6;" | 
! scope="row" style="background:#b0e0e6;" | Atlantic Ocean
| style="background:#b0e0e6;" |
|-
| style="background:#b0e0e6;" | 
! scope="row" style="background:#b0e0e6;" | Southern Ocean
| style="background:#b0e0e6;" |
|-valign="top"
| 
! scope="row" | South Shetland Islands
|-
| style="background:#b0e0e6;" | 
! scope="row" style="background:#b0e0e6;" | Southern Ocean
| style="background:#b0e0e6;" |
|-valign="top"
| 
! scope="row" | Antarctica
|-
|}

See also
53rd meridian west
55th meridian west

w054 meridian west